Kittie Fenley Parker  (1910–1994) was a botanist for the National Museum of Natural History and author of An Illustrated Guide to Arizona Weeds.

Biography
Parker née Fenley was born in 1910. She attended the University of California, Berkeley and earned her PhD from the University of Arizona in 1946. She began her teaching career at the University of Arizona's School of Agriculture where she taught from 1949 through 1953. She went on to teach botany at the George Washington University in Washington, D.C. She was a research associate at the National Museum of Natural History from 1959 through 1989. Parker was a member of the Botanical Society of Washington and the Potomac Chrysanthemum Society.

In 1972 Parker published An illustrated guide to Arizona weeds which was illustrated by Lucretia Breazeale Hamilton.

Parker died in San Diego, California on November 9, 1994.

References

1910 births
1994 deaths
American women botanists
University of California, Berkeley alumni
University of Arizona alumni
20th-century botanists